Oui (French: Yes) or OUI may refer to:

Places
 Oui, Burkina Faso, a village in northern Burkina Faso

Books and magazines
 Oui (magazine), a men's magazine
 Oui, by René Lévesque, 1980
 Oui, by Marc-Édouard Nabe, 1998
 Oui: The Paranoid-Critical Revolution, by Salvador Dalí and Robert Descharnes, 1971
 Oui, French translation of German novel Ja by Thomas Bernhard, 1978

Film and radio
 Oui (film), a 1996 French film
 Ouï FM, a French radio station

Music

Albums
 Oui (album), an album by the band The Sea and Cake, 2000
 Oui Avant-Garde á Chance, an album by Skyclad, 1997
 Oui Oui, Si Si, Ja Ja, Da Da, an album by Madness, 2012

Songs
 "Oui" (song), by Jeremih, 2015
 "Oui", by Sivas feat. NODE & Gilli, 2018
 "Oui", by Charles Aznavour
 "Oui", by Zazie, 2004
 "Oui mais... non", by Mylène Farmer, 2010

Acronyms
 Operating under the influence, a variant of driving under the influence
 Organic user interface, a user interface with a non-flat display
 Organizationally unique identifier, of computer hardware manufacturers